Yongdongaspis, colloquially known as the Binhai Yongdong, is an extinct genus of galeaspid within the monotypic family Yongdongaspididae. The type species is Y. littoralis and it was found in the Silurian-aged Huixingshao Formation of China. This makes it the oldest known fish fossil discovered in Chongqing to date.

The holotype was excavated in July 2020 and was prepared in 2021, before being named as the new species Yongdongaspis littoralis in July 2022.

See also
 Dunyu

References

Galeaspida
Prehistoric jawless fish genera
Fossil taxa described in 2022
Prehistoric animals of China
Silurian jawless fish
Chongqing